Atelodora pelochytana is a species of moth of the family Tortricidae. It is found in Australia, where it has been recorded from New South Wales.

References

Archipini
Moths described in 1881
Moths of Australia
Taxa named by Edward Meyrick